Aura (1994) is an album by the Finnish rock group CMX. The album gained the band its first near-hit single and some commercial airplay with "Ruoste". Although many people consider Aura to be the  band's seminal record, at this point many older fans were already scoffing at the more streamlined, acoustic songs and mellow soundscapes as compared to their earlier hardcore steamrolling. However, Aura pretty much defines the band's sound up to this day, with a mixture of heavy and light elements and songwriting reminiscent of 1960s and 1970s progressive rock.

Track listing
Songs written by A. W. Yrjänä, unless where noted. All lyrics by Yrjänä.

 "Mikään ei vie sitä pois" – 3:18 ("Nothing Takes it Away")
 "Sametinpehmeä" – 2:55 ("Soft as Velvet")
 "Elokuun kruunu" – 4:32 ("August's Crown")
 "Ruoste" – 4:01 ("Rust")
 "Nainen tanssii tangoa" – 4:34 ("Woman Dances the Tango")
 "Turkoosi" (Yrjänä, Halmkrona, Rasio, Kanniainen) – 4:20 ("Turquoise")
 "Kultanaamio" – 4:56 ("Gold Mask")
 "Raskas" – 4:12 ("Heavy")
 "Talvipäivänseisaus" – 4:46 ("Winter Solstice")
 "Työt ja päivät" – 5:17 ("Work and Days")
 "Pilvien kuningas" (Yrjänä, Halmkrona, Rasio, Kanniainen) – 9:25 ("King of the Clouds")
 "Aura" – 3:31 ("Aura")

Credits 
 A. W. Yrjänä – vocals, bass, acoustic guitar, producer
 Janne Halmkrona – guitars
 Timo Rasio – guitars
 Pekka Kanniainen – drums, percussion

Additional musicians 
 Martti Salminen – keyboards
 Risto Salmi – saxophone
 Henna Valvanne – recorder
 Frida Segerstråle – vocals 
 Kaarina Kilpiö – vocals

Technical 
 Veikko Huuskonen – string arrangements
 Gabi Hakanen – producer, engineer
 Dan Tigerstedt – mixing
 Pauli Saastamoinen – mastering
 Kain Ärjyvä – sleeve design
 Jouko Lehtola/Flaming Star – photography
 Inna Aarniala – photography
 Seppo Renvall – photography

See also 
 CMX discography

References

CMX (band) albums
1994 albums